Abū ʿAbd Allāh Muḥammad ibn Ismāʿīl, also known in his own time as al-Maymūn and hence sometimes incorrectly identified as Maymūn al-Qaddāḥ, was the son of Isma'il ibn Ja'far; he was an Ismāʿīlī Imam. The majority of Ismāʿīlī follow his descendants through his son Ahmad al-Wafi (Abd Allah ibn Muhammad). His descendants further founded the Fatimid dynasty, later called the Nizari and Musta'li.

Life 
Muhammad was born on 12th Rabi' al-Awwal 128 AH/c. 740 AD. His early childhood was spent under the protection of his grandfather Imam Ja'far al-Sadiq in Medina. Throughout his time in Medina he wore a disguise to protect his identity, with only selected missionaries and loyal members knowing about his true identity.

As per the 4th volume of Uyun'l-Akhbar (comp. 842/1438), Muhammad resided in Medina to spread Isma'ilism and to search for a place of hiding for himself. The Abbasid caliph of the time, Harun al-Rashid, was investigating Muhammad's whereabouts and had forces deployed throughout Medina in search for him. On search of his place by Harun al-Rashid, he concealed himself in underground passage constructed in his house and then left his place keeping his whereabouts a secret. Due to Harun al-Rashid's wife, Rabaida, and her loyalty to Muhammad ibn Ismāʿīl, Muhammad was able to evade enemy forces and migrate to Kufa.

He remained in Kufa for an extended period of time and completed his Imamate, which lasted 45 years. He died on 11 th Shawwal 193 AH/27 July 809 AD in the region of Farghana. A letter written in 354/965 by the Fatimid Imam Al-Mu'izz li-Din Allah (d. 365/975) states that, "The da'is used their own names as nick-names for the Imams in order to protect them from persecution; some people were misled by this to such a degree that they said that the descendant of Muhammad ibn Isma'il was Abd Allah ibn Maymun al-Qaddah." According to Arif Tamir in al-Qaramita (p. 87), "When Muhammad ibn Isma'il fled from the east and established in Palmyra in Syria, the centers of his activities; he called himself Maymun al-Qaddah."

His father Imam Ismāʿīl died during the lifetime of Imam Ja'far al-Sadiq. Idris Imad al-Din (died 872 AH or 1468 AD), the 19th Da'i al-Mutlaq of the Tayyibis, says in his book  that Ja'far al-Sadiq appointed Musa al-Kazim as his successor, but that his goal in doing so was to protect the Imamate of Muhammad ibn Isma'il. Muhammad was succeeded by his son Abd Allah ibn Muhammad (Ahmad al-Wafi), who became the 8th Ismāʿīlī Imam. The 8th, 9th and 10th Ismāʿīlī Imams are believed to have gone into seclusion because of the constant threat of death from the Abbasid dynasty.

See also
 List of Isma'ili imams
 Family tree linking Prophets to Shi'ite Imams

References

External links
 MUHAMMAD BIN ISMAIL (158-197/775-813)
 Maymūn’āl-Qaddāh

Ismaili imams
740s births
809 deaths
8th-century Arabs
9th-century Arabs